Luis Muñoz de Guzmán (1735 – 11 February 1808) was a Spanish colonial administrator who served as Royal Governor of Quito and Royal Governor of Chile.

Sources

Date of birth unknown
1735 births
1808 deaths
People from Seville
Royal Governors of Chile
History of Quito
Knights of Santiago